Hendrik Grobbelaar (born 8 February 1992) is a South African professional rugby union player, who most recently played with the . His regular position is flanker or number eight.

Rugby career

2006: Limpopo

Grobbelaar was born in Benoni, but grew up in Mookgophong (known as Naboomspruit until 2006) in the Limpopo province. He was selected to represent Limpopo at the 2008 Under-16 Grant Khomo Week held in Ermelo, where he started two of their three matches.

2012–2016: Griffons

In 2012, he was included in the Welkom-based ' Under-21 squad for their Under-21 Provincial Championship campaign. He started all six of their matches in the number eight jersey, scoring a try against  in a 40–43 defeat, but could not help his side to a victory, as they lost all six matches to finish bottom of the log.

He made his first start a week later against , but failed to feature for the Griffons for the remainder of 2013.

Grobbelaar got marginally more playing time in 2015, making three appearances off the bench in the Griffons' Vodacom Cup season before starting against the  during the Currie Cup First Division regular season and against the same opposition in their 40–47 semi-final loss a week later.

The Griffons finished ninth, to qualify to the Currie Cup First Division.

2016: Eastern Province Kings

Grobbelaar signed a contract to play for the Port Elizabeth-based  in the 2016 Currie Cup Premier Division. His only other appearance came as he started their rescheduled midweek match against  in a 24–47 defeat. and his side eventually lost all eight of their matches in the competition to finish bottom of the log.

References

South African rugby union players
Living people
1992 births
Rugby union locks
Rugby union flankers
Rugby union number eights
Eastern Province Elephants players
Griffons (rugby union) players
Rugby union players from Benoni